Shyamal  Ghoshal was a Bengali film and television actor. He was recognized for his work in Bengali cinema.

Career 
He had worked under the direction of Satyajit Ray , Ritwik Ghatak, Manju Dey ,Tarun Majumdar, etc. During his heyday, he was paired with Madhabi Mukherjee and Sailen Mukherjee.

Personal life 
He is the father of actress Chaiti Ghoshal.

Filmography 
 Headmaster, 1959
 Subarnarekha (film) 1962
 Kanna, 1962
 Mahanagar, 1963
 Charulata, 1964 As Umapada
 Trisna, 1965
 Chiriakhana, 1967
 Kuheli 1971
 Shajarur Kanta (1974 film)  As Byomkesh Boxi lead role
 Jukti Takko Aar Gappo ,1974
 Srikanter Will, 1979
 Paar, 1984
 Kahini, 1995
 Joto kando Katmandute, 1996
 Sesh Parba
 Nirjan Sanlap
 Bilambita Loy ,1970
 Jay Maa Tara
 Sonar Payra 
 Rater Rajanigandha

References

External links 
 

Bengali male actors
Indian male film actors
Male actors from Kolkata
Male actors in Bengali cinema
University of Calcutta alumni
2014 deaths
1942 births
20th-century Indian male actors